Cary Lu (December 4, 1945 – September 23, 1997) was an American writer specialising in the Apple Macintosh platform.

Early life
Born in Qingdao, China, Lu arrived in the United States at the age of three and grew up in California. He studied physics at University of California, Berkeley, and eventually earned a Ph.D. in biology from the California Institute of Technology.

Television career
Lu worked in television for several years on projects for NBC and CBS News, developed short films for Sesame Street and other children's programs on PBS and was the science and technology editor for the Children's Television Workshop.

He was part of the group that started Nova for PBS and worked on science and technology education projects for the governments of Australia, Kenya, and Algeria.

Writing career
Lu was a best-selling author of Macintosh-related books.

Possibly one of his most well-known works is The Apple Macintosh Book, the first edition of which was released almost simultaneously with the Macintosh 128K in 1984. The second edition covered the Macintosh 512K, while the third edition covered six Macintosh models in all. The fourth edition of the book (published in 1992) covered 21 models (including discontinued models, such as the Macintosh 128K), and even included mentions of the Macintosh Classic series, the Macintosh Quadra series, the PowerBooks, and System 7.

Lu was founding managing editor of High Technology, technology editor for Inc. and a columnist on future technology for Inc. Technology. He wrote columns and articles for Macworld magazine and other computer and technology publications.

His final book, The Race for Bandwidth: Understanding Data Transmission, was finished by friends, the technology writers Adam C. Engst and Stephen Manes, and published posthumously.

Death 
Cary Lu died of cancer at the age of 51.

Miscellaneous
While the first edition of Katie Hafners and Matthew Lyons famous book about the history of the Internet (Where Wizards stay up late, 1996) was solely dedicated to J. C. R. Licklider, the 2003 edition was dedicated to Cary Lu as well, who had died in 1997.

Bibliography
 The Apple Macintosh Book
 E-World—The Official Guide for Macintosh Users
 The Race for Bandwidth: Understanding Data Transmission

References

External links
 An Obituary for Cary Lu from TidBITS

1945 births
1997 deaths
American technology writers
American television producers
California Institute of Technology alumni
Republic of China (1912–1949) emigrants to the United States
Writers from Qingdao
University of California, Berkeley alumni
American people of Chinese descent